Christophe Jezewski, in Polish Krzysztof Andrzej Jeżewski (born 24 April 1939) is a poet, musicologist, essayist and translator of Polish descent who has been living in France since 1970.

Biography 
Christophe Jeżewski was born in Warsaw, in a Francophone family of humanistic tradition. His maternal grandfather Adam Czartkowski, a scientist and historian of culture, was the author of monographs on Chopin and Beethoven; His father was an anglicist and economist, and his mother Zofia Jeżewska - a writer, journalist, and art critic was also the author of four books on Chopin.

At an early age, he developed a passion for translation, which he considered as a bridge between cultures and peoples. At the age of sixteen, he translated the Chantefables et Chantefleurs by Robert Desnos. Later, while studying the Romance languages at the Warsaw University, he became one of the most active translators of French poetry (Segalen, Oscar Venceslas de Lubicz-Milosz, Michaux, René Char, Jean Follain, the surrealists, Eugène Guillevic, etc.) and Hispano-American. He introduced the Poles to some poetic geniuses of this continent: Jorge Luis Borges, José Gorostiza, Octavio Paz. At the same time, he continued his poetic work (beginning in 1968 in the magazine Poezja) and was a musical critic. He also began to translate Polish poetry into French, in particular Cyprian Norwid (1821–1883), the father of Polish modern poetry and great Christian thinker of whom John Paul II claimed inspiration. In 1963 he completed his studies of Romance philology at the Warsaw University.

In 1970, the political climate in Poland had become unbearable because of the wave of "red fascism", and he left thanks to a French government scholarship and settled permanently in France. From 1971 to 1973, he collaborated with the Polish staff for the ORTF which broadcast his 65 portraits of the most prominent French poets of the twentieth.

In 1976 he obtained his degree of Polish literature at the Paris-Sorbonne University  and married Maria Thelma Noval, a painter, poet and sociologist from Philippines, of whom he had two children. Since 1978, he has made several stays in the Philippines.

Since 1974, he continues in France an intense activity as a translator of Polish literature, makes discover among others Cyprian Norwid, Witold Gombrowicz, Bruno Schulz, Czesław Miłosz (Nobel Prize in Literature 1980), Krzysztof Kamil Baczyński, Wisława Szymborska (Nobel Prize in Literature 1996) and composers Karol Szymanowski, Stanisław Moniuszko, Mieczysław Karłowicz. He collaborates with the Polish emigre press and the French music press, organizes "poetry and music" evenings and gives lectures on Polish culture and music. After the Martial law in Poland was established on 13 December 1981, he had in France a vast activity of information and propagation of the democratic and Christian ideas of Solidarność.

In 1984 he left Paris and settled with his family in Noisy-le-Grand where he lived until now. In autumn 1989 he obtained French nationality.

A specialist of Cyprian Norwid, he has been president of the Les Amis de C. K. Norwid Parisian association since 2003.

Distinctions 
 Scholarships for translation and creation of the CNL (1983, 1991, 1996, 2000, 2006, 2010, 2014)
 Karol Szymanowski medal (1984)
 Prize of the Society of Polish Authors and Composers ZAiKS (1987)
 C. Jelenski Prize of the literary Institute Kultura (1991)
 Scholarships from the Minister of Culture and the Polish National Heritage (1999, 2003, 2009)
 Prize of the Polish PEN-club (2007)
 Translation scholarship of the European Prize for Literature (2007)
 Silver Medal of the Gloria Artis (2011)
 Cyprian Norwid Foundation Medal (Lublin), (2013)
 Witold Hulewicz Prize (2019)
 APAJTE Prize  (2019)
 Cyprian Kamil Norwid Prize (2021)

Publications

Translations into French 
 Cyprian Norwid, L'Intarissable source, Pierre-Guillaume de Roux, 2017
 Cyprian Norwid, Chopin/Szopen, Maison d'édition GAL, 2010
 John-Paul II, Mon dernier livre de méditations pour le troisième millénaire, Éditions du Rocher, 2008
 Tadeusz Różewicz, Regio et autres poèmes, Arfuyen 2008
 Cyprian Kamil Norwid, Cléopâtre et César : tragédie historique écrite aussi bien pour la scène que pour la lecture, avec une mise en valeur des gestes dramatiques et de leur succession, Cahiers bleus-Librairie bleue, 2006
 Krzysztof Kamil Baczyński, Testament de feu : poèmes, Arfuyen, 2006
 Krzysztof Kamil Baczyński, L'insurrection angélique, Le Cri édition : In'hui, 2004
 Cyprian Norwid, Vade-mecum Les Éditions Noir sur Blanc, 2004
 Anna Bolecka, Mon cher Franz,Sabine Wespieser éditeur, 2004
 John-Paul II, Mon livre de méditations pour ceux qui souffrent, qui doutent, qui espèrent, Éditions du Rocher, 2004
 Witold Gombrowicz, Souvenirs de Pologne, Éditions Gallimard, 2002
 Andrzej Czcibor-Piotrowski, Un amour couleur myrtilles, Éditions Robert Laffont, 2001
 Cyprian Norwid, Lumières du Royaume, Éditions Bénédictines, 2001
 Maria Nurowska, Celle qu'on aime, Éditions Phébus, 2000
 Tadeusz Kępiński, Witold Gombrowicz et le monde de sa jeunesse, Gallimard, 2000
 Cyprian Norwid, O Szopenie/Sur Chopin, Lodart, 1999 
 Andrzej Kuśniewicz, Constellations : les Signes du zodiaque, 10-18, 1999
 Andrzej Kuśniewicz, Eroica, Éditions des Syrtes, 1999
 Andrzej Zaniewski, Mémoires d'un rat, Belfond, 1994  Librairie générale française, 1998 
 Maria Nurowska, Un amour de VarsovieEditions Albin Michel, 1996, France Loisirs, 1997, Editions de la Seine, 1998 
 Wisława Szymborska, Dans le fleuve d'Héraclite, Maison de la poésie Nord-Pas-de-Calais, 1995
 Witold Gombrowicz, Journal. Tomes I à III, 1953–1969, Julliard, then Denoël 1976, then Christian Bourgois 1981, then Gallimard, 1995
 Witold Gombrowicz, Souvenirs de Pologne, Christian Bourgois, 1990, 1995
 Andrzej Kuśniewicz, Constellations : les signes du zodiaque, Robert Laffont, 1993
 Jerzy Andrzejewski, Les ténèbres couvrent la terre, Belfond, 1991
 Witold Gombrowicz, Moi et mon double, L'Œil de la lettre, 1990
 Witold Gombrowicz, Varia II, Christian Bourgois, 1989
 Czesław Miłosz, Terre inépuisable, Fayard, 1988
 Czesław Miłosz, Témoignage de la poésie, Presses universitaires de France, 1987
 Andrzej Kuśniewicz, L'État d'apesanteur, Albin Michel, 1979, then Librairie générale française, 1983
 Andrzej Kuśniewicz, La Leçon de langue morte, Albin Michel, 1981
 Andrzej Kuśniewicz, Le Roi des Deux-Siciles, Albin Michel, 1977

Poems and essays 
 Music, Anima Poetry Press, 2017
 Księga snów/Le Livre des rêves, Éditions Polyglotte, 2013
 Swiatłość u progu, Topos, 2012
 Płomień i noc/ La Flamme et la nuit, Adam Marszałek, 2012
 Cyprian Norwid et la pensée de l'Empire du Milieu,L'Harmattan, 2011
 Cyprian Norwid a myśl i poetyka Kraju Srodka, Wydawnictwa Uniwersytetu Warszawskiego, 2011
 Adam Czartkowski, Beethoven. Próba portretu duchowego. Rozszerzył, opracował i antologią polskich wierszy o kompozytorze opatrzył Krzysztof Andrzej Jeżewski, PIW, 2010
 Le pire est certain. Anthologie de la poésie catastrophiste polonaise du XX, Zurfluh/Cahiers Bleus, 2009
 Druga księga snow, Miniatura, 2009
 W zaświecie snu, Correspondance des Arts, 2009
 Zagle niebieskie, Adam Marszałek, 2008
 Okruchy z wysokości, in: Angelus Silesius Anielski wędrowiec, Biblioteka Telgte, 2007
 Popiół słoneczny Nowy Swiat, 2005 
 L'épreuve du feu ; précédé de Les vignes de l'espace : poèmes, Librairie Bleue, 2005
 Cyprian Norwid, poète et penseur catholique, Liberté politique, 2001
 Kryształowy ogrod, Oficyna Krakowska, 2000
 Chopin, Szymanowski et leurs poètes = Chopin, Szymanowski i ich poeci, Librairie Bleue, 1999
 Znak pojednania, "W drodze", 1997
 Muzyka, Tikkun, 1995
 La musique : poèmes, L'Harmattan, 1994
 Księga snów Miniatura, 1990
 Próba ognia, Editions Dembinski, 1990

Other 
He also translated into Polish many French poets of the 20th century, notably Victor Segalen, Oscar Milosz, Henri Michaux and René Char, as well as authors from other languages such as Octavio Paz, José Gorostiza, Jorge Luis Borges, Kathleen Raine, Angelus Silesius and Maya Noval.

References

External links 
 Écrire la nature au XXe siècle : les romanciers polonais des confins
 Jeżewski, Krzysztof (1939- ) on Nukat

Writers from Warsaw
1939 births
Living people
Polish male poets
French male poets
20th-century French essayists
20th-century Polish writers
21st-century French writers
Polish writers in French
University of Warsaw alumni
Polish–French translators
Polish musicologists
20th-century French musicologists
21st-century French musicologists
French music critics
Polish emigrants to France
20th-century Polish male writers
French male non-fiction writers